"Hammer to Fall" is a 1984 song by the British rock band Queen. Written by guitarist Brian May, the song is the eighth track on their 1984 album The Works. It was the fourth and final single to be released from that album, although the single version was edited down by thirty seconds from the version on the album. Different sleeves were used to package this single and the live picture sleeve is now a collector's item. The song harks back to the old roots of the band, being built around a hard angular and muscular riff.

The song peaked at number 3 in South Africa, and 13 in the UK Singles Chart. It was featured in the film Highlander, a movie for which the band had composed tie-in songs. The music video was filmed in Brussels during The Works Tour, and features drummer Roger Taylor wearing an oversized message T-shirt ("CHOOSE LIFE") created by Katharine Hamnett.

"Hammer to Fall" was the third song the band performed at Live Aid in 1985. The song features in the setlist of both The Works Tour and The Magic Tour. The full album version of the song appears on Queen Rocks while the single version appears on Greatest Hits II and Classic Queen.

Interpretation
The lyrics at several points refer to the Cold War era in which the band members grew up, fuelling the popular conception that the song was about nuclear war:

For we who grew up tall and proud
In the shadow of the mushroom cloud

The term "waiting for the hammer to fall" in the song was taken to refer to the anticipation by the public that Cold War would turn "hot" – or, alternatively, as a reference to the Soviet Hammer and Sickle.

The song also contains references to death and its inevitability:

Rich or poor or famous
For your truth it's all the same (oh no oh no)

The question of the meaning of the song was effectively settled when May wrote on his website that "Hammer to Fall is really about life and death, and being aware of death as being part of life", and that "the Hammer coming down is only a symbol of the Grim Reaper doing his job!"

Reception
Cash Box said "With customary raw energy highlighted by the powerful vocals of Freddie Mercury and the unstoppable energy of guitarist/composer Brian May, Queen still exemplifies the essence of solid rock. The song itself offers nothing particularly new, but is performed energetically and contains more than enough of what Queen’s fans have come to expect.."

Music video
The music video was directed by David Mallet, containing footage of a performance of the song in Brussels during The Works Tour.

Live performances
"Hammer to Fall" was the third song on the band's setlist at Live Aid, after "Bohemian Rhapsody" and "Radio Ga Ga". Live versions of the song in the 1980s also usually served as an opportunity for touring keyboardist Spike Edney to appear onstage playing rhythm guitar, as he was usually not visible from behind his keyboard stack. "Hammer to Fall" features in the setlist of both The Works Tour and The Magic Tour.

At the Freddie Mercury Tribute Concert in 1992, Extreme singer Gary Cherone performed the song with Queen and Tony Iommi of Black Sabbath, having previously done a medley of other Queen songs with his own group.

A different version of the song with the first part played in the style of a ballad was played by May on his 1998 solo tour promoting his second album Another World. This arrangement was revived for Queen + Paul Rodgers in 2005.

In other media
 The song appears in the 1987 science fiction book The Tommyknockers by Stephen King.
 A portion of the song is heard during the scene with the well-armed Vietnam veteran in the 1986 film Highlander.
 A portion of the song is heard during a scene of the sixth episode of Netflix's Stranger Things second season.
 The song is heard in the 2018 biopic Bohemian Rhapsody where Queen's Live Aid performance is reenacted.

Track listings 
7" Single

 A Side. "Hammer to Fall" (Single Version) - 3:40
 B Side. "Tear It Up" - 3:24

12" Single

 A Side. "Hammer to Fall" (Extended Version) - 5:25
 B Side. "Tear It Up" - 3:24

Personnel
Freddie Mercury – lead and backing vocals
Brian May – electric guitar, backing vocals
Roger Taylor – drums, backing vocals
John Deacon – bass guitar
Fred Mandel – synthesiser

Charts

Weekly charts

Year-end charts

Certifications

References

External links
 Official YouTube videos: original music video, Queen + Paul Rodgers, Queen + Paul Rodgers (Live in Ukraine), Freddie Mercury Tribute Concert (with Gary Cherone and Tony Iommi)
"Hammer to Fall" at discogs

Queen (band) songs
1984 singles
Anti-war songs
Songs from Highlander (franchise)
Protest songs
Songs about nuclear war and weapons
Songs written by Brian May
Song recordings produced by Reinhold Mack
EMI Records singles
Capitol Records singles
Hollywood Records singles
1984 songs
British hard rock songs
Music videos directed by David Mallet (director)